Sulu is a province of the Philippines.

Sulu may also refer to:

Locations

Philippines
 Sulu Archipelago, in the Philippines
 Sulu Sea, in the southwestern area of the Philippines
 Apostolic Prefecture of Sulu, a Catholic missionary jurisdiction in the Sulu Archipelago from 1953 to 1958
 Sultanate of Sulu (1457–1917), in the Philippines
 Royal House of Sulu of the Sultanate of Sulu

Estonia
 Sulu, Rapla County, village in Märjamaa Parish, Rapla County, Estonia
 Sulu, Tartu County, village in Kambja Parish, Tartu County, Estonia

People  
 Aytaç Sulu (born 1985), German-Turkish football player
 Suluk (Turgesh khagan), or Sulu (died c. 738), leader of the Turgesh confederation

Fictional characters 
 Hikaru Sulu, fictional character in Star Trek
 Sulu (Captain Underpants)

Other uses
 Sulu (skirt), a garment worn in Fiji

See also
 Zulu (disambiguation)